Bernard M. Kahn (April 26, 1930 – April 21, 2021) was an American screenwriter.

Education

He received bachelor's and master's degrees in English literature from the University of Michigan.

At the 1953 Maccabiah Games in Israel, in swimming he won a gold medal in the 100 m backstroke.

Screenwriting career

He wrote for the sitcoms The Second Hundred Years, My Favorite Martian, and Bewitched, among others. Kahn also co-wrote the 1971 Disney television movie The Barefoot Executive with Joseph McEveety, Lila Garrett and Stu Billett, and wrote the screenplay for the 1985 comedy film Basic Training.

In 1972, his play Our Very Own Hole in the Ground was produced at La MaMa Experimental Theatre Club in the East Village, Manhattan, directed by Henry Hewes.

Kahn received the Writers Guild of America Award for Television: Episodic Comedy multiple times during the 1970s.

Selected works

The Smothers Brothers Show
Occasional Wife (1966 television series)
Bob & Carol & Ted & Alice (TV series)
The Practice (1976 television series)
The Paul Lynde Show
Brothers and Sisters (1979 TV series)
List of Bewitched episodes
List of The Brady Bunch episodes
List of Chico and the Man episodes
List of The Courtship of Eddie's Father episodes
List of Maude episodes
List of The Partridge Family episodes
List of Superboy episodes
List of Three's Company episodes

References

External links

Bernie Kahn on Rotten Tomatoes
Bernie Kahn on TV.com
Kahn's page on La MaMa Archives Digital Collections

1930 births
2021 deaths
Writers from Brooklyn
American screenwriters
University of Michigan alumni
Maccabiah Games gold medalists for the United States
Competitors at the 1953 Maccabiah Games
Maccabiah Games medalists in swimming